William Thomas Berry (born July 31, 1958) is an American musician who was the drummer for the alternative rock band R.E.M. Although best known for his economical drumming style, Berry also played other instruments, including guitar, bass guitar and piano, both for songwriting and on R.E.M. albums. In 1995, Berry suffered a cerebral aneurysm onstage and collapsed. After a successful recovery he left the music industry two years later to become a farmer, and has since maintained a low profile, making sporadic reunions with R.E.M. and appearing on other artists' recordings. His departure made him the only member of the band to not remain with them during their entire run. Berry eventually returned to the industry in 2022.

Early years (1958–1980)
William Thomas Berry was born on July 31, 1958, in Duluth, Minnesota, the fifth child of Don and Anna Berry. At the age of three, Berry moved with his family to Wauwatosa, Wisconsin, a suburb of Milwaukee, where they would remain for the next seven years. In 1968, they moved again, this time to Sandusky, Ohio.

In 1972, the Berry family made their final move, to Macon, Georgia, just in time for Bill to start high school at Mount de Sales Academy. It was there that he met bass guitarist Mike Mills, and they played together in several different bands, including Shadowfax. Their first attempt at a career in music was short-lived. He and Mills decided to make money by getting day jobs. They rented an apartment on Arlington Place in Macon and Bill landed a job at the Paragon booking agency next door.

Berry and Mills moved to Athens, Georgia, in 1978, where they met Michael Stipe and Peter Buck. Prior to dropping out, Berry studied pre-law at the University of Georgia.

R.E.M. years (1980–1997)

R.E.M. was formed in 1980. In addition to his duties as a drummer, Berry contributed occasional guitar, bass, mandolin, vocals, keyboards and piano on studio tracks. In concert, he sometimes performed on bass, and supplied regular backing vocals.  Berry also made notable songwriting contributions, particularly for "Everybody Hurts" and "Man on the Moon", both from Automatic for the People. Other Berry songs included "Perfect Circle", "Driver 8", "Cant Get There from Here" and "I Took Your Name". The song "Leave" was also written by Berry for R.E.M.'s album New Adventures in Hi-Fi (1996), which was his last album with the band.

Berry was also responsible for toning down the lyrics of the song "Welcome to the Occupation." Stipe's original lyric was "hang your freedom fighters" which, given the Reagan administration's active support for the Nicaraguan contra "freedom fighters", sounded violent and militant, although Stipe himself countered that the line could be taken multiple ways ("hang" as in either "lynch" or "frame on a wall"). Berry's objection ultimately led the line to be changed to "hang your freedom higher."

During 1984, Berry also was drummer for the impromptu Hindu Love Gods, which featured his R.E.M. bandmates Peter Buck, Mike Mills, rocker Warren Zevon, and Bryan Cook.

On-stage collapse and leaving R.E.M. (1995–1997)
On March 1, 1995, at the Patinoire Auditorium in Lausanne, Switzerland, Berry collapsed on stage during an R.E.M. show from a ruptured brain aneurysm. He recovered and rejoined the band, but left in October 1997, saying that he no longer had the drive or enjoyment level to be in the band, and that he wanted to not travel. He later explained on VH-1's Behind the Music: I didn't wake up one day and decide, "I just can't stand these guys anymore" or anything. I feel like I'm ready for a life change. I'm still young enough that I can do something else. I've been pounding the tubs since I was nine years old ... I'm ready to do something else.

Acquiescing to Berry's wishes, R.E.M. announced that it would reluctantly continue as a three-piece outfit. They continued to tour with several accompanying musicians, including long-time sidemen Ken Stringfellow and Scott McCaughey and employed Joey Waronker and Bill Rieflin as live drummers over the next decade.

Semi-retirement (1997–2022)
Berry left the music business and became a farmer, working on his hay farm in Farmington, Georgia, near Athens in late 1997.

Prior to the group's induction into the Rock and Roll Hall of Fame, Berry granted his first interview in several years, discussing life after retirement. "It's a great chance to get back together and perform with R.E.M., which I always loved doing", he said.

Asked where he goes on vacations, in an interview at his home in 2019, Berry stated: "I would never go on vacation. Vacation for me is right here. I spent enough time in airports and in vans and on buses. I kind of like sitting still for a while. Still haven't grown tired of that." He ventures in to Athens to "see shows I want; I don't just go out and hang out at bars." He added: "I get into shows about 1.6 times a month: maybe not twice a month, but more than once."

Berry maintains that he never enjoyed being a drummer. "It's just not the most musical instrument. I've never written a song on a set of drums." His preferred instrument is the acoustic guitar, which (as of 2019) is something he plays every day. "I wish I'd played more of it before I retired. I've done most of my practising after I've retired. I've become a pretty good guitarist now; I wasn't then."

His musical activities after leaving R.E.M. have been sporadic, but did include recording for the Tourette Syndrome Charity Album Welcome Companions in 2000. On May 11, 2018, he performed at the Winterville Auditorium in Winterville, Georgia, as part of a quintet named Mayor Ferrelle and the Councilmen,  formed by the band's vocalist and lead guitarist, city mayor Dodd Ferrelle. The other three members were John Kean, David Barbe and Adam Poulin.

Berry appeared in the 2020 Song Exploder documentary about the band's song "Losing My Religion", even playing part of his drum line from the song. In the same documentary, Peter Buck says, "There's no drummer like Bill Berry on Earth. None. I have a lot of drummer friends, and they all ask me the same thing: 'What's his secret?' And I can't tell you, because I don't know. My theory is that he uses the space between the high hat and the snare drum in a kind of disco-y way, without being too disco."

In 1999, Joey Waronker explained the process of how he learned Berry's drum parts. He had learned around fifty of R.E.M.'s songs. "I think we have about 40 that we’re rotating amongst. I had to make a book — just notes — on every song. It's really, really subtle rhythmically. There's a lot going on, and I never noticed it. I'm a drummer, and never picked up on it. I was listening to the songs, saying, 'These are definitely not straightforward.'"

Return to the music industry (2022–present) 
In 2022, twenty-five years after his departure from R.E.M., Berry formed a new supergroup called The Bad Ends with Athens- and Atlanta-based musicians Mike Mantione of Five Eight on guitar and vocals, Dave Domizi on bass and vocals, Geoff Melkonian on keyboards and vocals, Christian Lopez on guitars and mandolin, and Berry on drums and backing vocals. The origins of the group are a chance meeting between Mike Mantione and Berry on a street in Athens. Mantione had recently been described by Peter Buck as "the unsung hero of Athens rock and roll" and was offered "an opportunity to play in the game again", as in playing music professionally.

The group have released one single and video called "All Your Friends Are Dying" and performed a hometown show on November 27, 2022. They released their debut album, The Power and the Glory, on January 20, 2023.

Personal life
On March 22, 1986, Berry married girlfriend Mari Berry. They divorced in 1997. When crack began to infiltrate Athens in the early 1990s, the couple moved to nearby Farmington. "In 1988, I decided that I would broaden my portfolio, which was pretty slim back then. It's not like I was rolling in dough," he explained in 2019. "I wanted to buy land and found this spot. It's sixty acres, and it's far enough outside of town that it was cheap. It was, like, $2,000/acre back in '88. Land's more like $10–$12,000 now. It was strictly an investment; I was going to sell it later." His farm, which includes sheep, is at the north end of his property. A caretaker works on the farm; Berry does not anymore. He has a garden, but his caretaker also looks after that. "I get the rewards of it, but he does all the work."

In 2003, Berry and Cybele Lange had a son, Owen.

Berry was an avid golfer while a member of R.E.M.

Discography

With R.E.M.

Without members of R.E.M.

With Peter Buck and Mike Mills

With Peter Buck

Reunions with R.E.M.
Performances of the three-piece R.E.M. reunited with their original drummer.

See also
 Albums produced by Bill Berry
 Songs written by Bill Berry

References
 Source for discography: Marcus Gray – It Crawled from the South

External links
 iZine's interview with Berry from 1994

1958 births
Living people
Farmers from Georgia (U.S. state)
Grammy Award winners
American male drummers
American rock drummers
American rock songwriters
American male songwriters
Musicians from Athens, Georgia
Musicians from Duluth, Minnesota
People from Oconee County, Georgia
R.E.M. members
Songwriters from Minnesota
University of Georgia people
American alternative rock musicians
Alternative rock drummers
Musicians from Macon, Georgia
Hindu Love Gods (band) members
Record producers from Minnesota
Record producers from Georgia (U.S. state)
20th-century American drummers